Wolkite City F.C. (Amharic:) is a professional football club based in Wolkite, Ethiopia. They play in the Ethiopian Premier League, the top division of football in Ethiopia.

History 
Wolkite Ketema was founded in 2010. The club last played in the second division, Ethiopian Higher League, during the 2018–2019 season. That season Wolkite earned a promotion to the Ethiopian Premier League by finishing top of their respective group. To strengthen their team for their first season in the top flight, they signed a Ghanaian international Kweku Andoh, who most recently played for Ethiopian champions Mekelle 70 Enderta.

Wolkite officially signed a two-year kit deal with Singapore-based apparel maker Mafro Sports in September 2019.

Support 
Wolkite City enjoys a strong fan base with supporters often traveling with the team during away matches.

Stadium 
The club plays its home matches at Wolkite Stadium. The pitch at the stadium was renovated in 2019 as a result of the Ethiopian Premier League's governing body deeming it unfit to host premier league matches.

Ownership 
The club has been owned by the Wolkite city administration since its founding in 2010. In February 2021, the club board announced that 51% of the club would be sold as shares to the public with 49% staying under the city administration.

Departments 
The club has a team competing in the U20 Ethiopian Premier League.

Active departments 

 Football team (U20)
 Basketball team

Players

First-team squad 
As of 13 March 2021

Club officials 
Vice-president:  Abebaw Solomon

Coaching staff 
As of 2 March 2021

Team leader:  Kamel Jemal 

Manager/head coach:  Degarege Yigzaw

First assistant coach:  Abdulali Tessema

First-team goalkeeper coach:  Belete Wedajo

Team doctor:  Mohammed Sied

Former players 

  Abdulrahman Mubarek
  Abdulkerim Worku
 Remedan Yesuf
 Tomas Simretu
 Jemal Tasew
 Mohamed Awal

References

1973 establishments in Africa
Football clubs in Ethiopia
Sport in the Southern Nations, Nationalities, and Peoples' Region